Cookie salad is a dessert salad from the U.S. states of Minnesota and North Dakota made with buttermilk, vanilla pudding, whipped cream, mandarin oranges, and fudge stripe shortbread cookies. Dessert salads, like glorified rice and cookie salad, are more common in the cuisine of the Midwestern United States than other parts of the country. They are popular with children and a common contribution to holiday tables and potlucks.  Berries can also be added. The salad is also prepared in other areas of the Midwestern United States.

See also
Glorified rice
Snickers salad
Watergate salad

References

Further reading
 

Cuisine of the Midwestern United States
Cuisine of Minnesota
Salads
Cookies